The Nicholson Junior KN-2 was a low power, high wing, two seat, cabin monoplane intended for sport or flight training in the United States in the late 1920s. Only one was built.

Design and development

The Junior KN-2 (KN came from the initials of builder Kenny and designer Nicholson) was a high wing monoplane with 5° of sweep and 1.5° of dihedral. The fabric-covered wings used the popular, flat-bottomed Clark Y profile and were built around laminated spars, aluminium alloy (Hyblum) ribs and steel tube drag struts. The ailerons were of the Frise type and had dural structures.  The wings could be folded for transport or storage.

The fuselage was a Chromium-Molybdenum steel tube structure of Warren truss form and was fabric-covered. The engine was nose-mounted, with a choice between the Continental A40 flat four and the Szekely SR-3 three cylinder radial engines. The Junior's two seat cabin was under the wing and provided two side-by-side seats with dual control. Behind the wing the fuselage tapered to the tail with the tailplane mounted on top, wire-braced from a triangular fin which carried a broad and largely straight-edged rudder.

The Junior's landing gear was fixed and conventional, with a long tailskid. It had Goodyear Airwheel mainwheels, with large, low pressure tyres on split axles with  semi-oleo landing struts from the upper fuselage longerons and drag struts from the lower longerons. The wheeled undercarriage was designed so it could be easily replaced by floats.

Its benign flight characteristics had been established by June 1931 but with the Great Depression deepening, only one was completed.

Specifications

References

Single-engined tractor aircraft
High-wing aircraft
1920s United States sport aircraft